Y Sigue La Mata Dando (Eng.: And We Keep Doing It) is the title of a studio album released by duranguense ensemble Grupo Montéz de Durango. This album became their second number-one set on the Billboard Top Latin Albums. A special edition was also released including a DVD with music videos and karaoke versions of the songs included, along with biography, discography and photo gallery of the group.

Track listing
The information from Billboard and Allmusic.

CD track listing

DVD track listing

Personnel
This information from Allmusic.
Marty Bilecki — Engineer, digital mastering, mixing
Alfredo Ramírez Corral — Arranger, keyboards, vocals, engineer, digital mastering, mixing
Gerardo Vázquez G. — Creative director
Elías Méndez — Saxophone, guest appearance
Ismael J. Montoya — Creative director
Jesús Ortíz — Engineer, Mixing
Armando Aguirre Ramírez — Tamboura
Daniel Avila Terrazas — Tamboura, drums
Jose Luis Terrazas — Director, performer, drums, creative consultant

Chart performance

Sales and certifications

References

2005 albums
Grupo Montez de Durango albums
Disa Records albums